Samuel Alan Mortimer (18 November 1892 – 8 November 1967) was an Australian rules footballer who played with St Kilda and Collingwood in the Victorian Football League (VFL).

Notes

External links 

Sam Mortimer's playing statistics from The VFA Project
Sam Mortimer's profile at Collingwood Forever

1892 births
1967 deaths
Australian rules footballers from Melbourne
St Kilda Football Club players
Collingwood Football Club players